Mika Lehto (born 21 April 1964) is a Finnish wrestler. He competed in the men's freestyle 62 kg at the 1988 Summer Olympics.

References

1964 births
Living people
Finnish male sport wrestlers
Olympic wrestlers of Finland
Wrestlers at the 1988 Summer Olympics
Sportspeople from Helsinki